Garske is an unincorporated community in Ramsey County, in the U.S. state of North Dakota.

History
A Jewish homesteading community named the Garske Colony was settled in 1883 and lasted until about 1925.  The Sons of Jacob Cemetery, its cemetery, was listed on the National Register of Historic Places in June, 2017.

References

Unincorporated communities in Ramsey County, North Dakota
Unincorporated communities in North Dakota
Russian-Jewish culture in the United States